Pretend You're Alive is the first full-length album by rock band Lovedrug. It was released in 2004 on The Militia Group. Lyrics by Michael Shepard. Music by Michael Shepard, Adam Ladd and Matt Bentley.

Track listing 
"In Red" - 4:10
"Blackout" - 5:41
"Spiders" - 3:10
"Rocknroll" - 3:22
"Pretend You're Alive" - 5:11
"Pandamoranda" - 2:46
"Down Towards the Healing" - 5:28
"The Monster" - 5:06
"Angels with Enemies" - 4:12
"Radiology" - 4:29
"Candy" - 4:38
"It Won't Last" - 7:04
"Paper Scars" - 1:47

References

2004 debut albums
Lovedrug albums
The Militia Group albums